Francis Sydney Smythe, better known as Frank Smythe or F. S. Smythe (6 July 1900  – 27 June 1949), was an English mountaineer, author, photographer and botanist. He is best remembered for his mountaineering in the Alps as well as in the Himalayas, where he identified a region that he named the "Valley of Flowers", now a protected park. His ascents include two new routes on the Brenva Face of Mont Blanc, Kamet, and attempts on Kangchenjunga and Mount Everest in the 1930s. It was said that he had a tendency for irascibility, something some of his mountaineering contemporaries said "decreased with altitude".

Biography

Smythe was born at Maidstone in Kent and educated in Switzerland after an initial period at Berkhamsted School. He trained as an electrical engineer and worked for brief periods with the Royal Air Force and Kodak before devoting himself to writing and public lecturing.  Smythe enjoyed mountaineering, photography, collecting plants, and gardening; he toured as a lecturer; and he wrote a total of twenty seven books.
Smythe's focused approach is well documented, not only through his own writings, but by his contemporaries and later works.

Among his many public lectures, Smythe gave several to the Royal Geographical Society, his first in 1931 titled "Explorations in Garhwal around Kamet" and his second in 1947 titled "An Expedition to the Lloyd George Mountains, North-East British Columbia".

Smythe was a prodigious writer and produced many popular books. However his book The Kangchenjunga Adventure launched Smythe as a legitimate and respected author.

During the Second World War he served in the Canadian Rockies as a mountaineer training officer for the Lovat Scouts, and in Braemar, Scotland, where he led the Commando Mountain and Snow Warfare Centre, and where John Hunt worked for a while with him as an instructor. He went on to write two books about climbing in the Rockies, Rocky Mountains (1948) and Climbs in the Canadian Rockies (1951). Mount Smythe (10,650 ft) was named in his honour.

In 1949, in Delhi, he was taken ill with food poisoning; then a succession of malaria attacks took their toll. He died on 27 June 1949, two weeks before his 49th birthday.

Mountaineering
 1927 and 1928 Smythe, together with T. Graham Brown, made the first ascent of two routes on the Brenva Face of Mont Blanc, the Sentinelle Rouge and Route Major. These were the first routes to be put up on the face.
 1930 Smythe was a member of the international team (Germany, Austria, Switzerland and Great Britain), to attempt Kangchenjunga, under the leadership of Günter Dyhrenfurth.
 1931 Smythe was the leader of the first successful expedition to climb Kamet (7,756 m) in 1931, at the time it was the highest peak yet climbed. During the Kamet expedition Smythe and R. L. Holdsworth discovered what they called the Valley of Flowers in the Himalaya, now in the state of Uttarakhand, India.
 1933 Smythe was a member of Hugh Ruttledge's Everest expedition.
 1936 Smythe was again a member of Hugh Ruttledge's 2nd Everest Expedition.
 1938 Smythe was a member of the Mount Everest expedition led by Bill Tilman.

Bibliography
The following is a list of the books written by Frank Smythe;
 Climbs and Ski Runs (1930) Blackwood, Edinburgh
 The Kangchenjunga Adventure (1930) Gollanz, London
 Kamet Conquered (1932) Gollanz, London
 An Alpine Journey (1934) Hodder, London
 The Spirit of the Hills (1935) Hodder, London
 Over Tyrolese Hills (1936) Hodder, London
 Camp 6 (1937) Hodder, London
 The Valley of Flowers (1938) Hodder, London
 Peaks and Flowers of the Central Himalayas (1938, The Geographical Magazine article)
 The Mountain Scene (1937) A&C Black
 Peaks and Valleys (1938) A&C Black
 A Camera in the Hills (1939) A&C Black
 Mountaineering Holiday (1940) Hodder, London
 Edward Whymper (1940) Hodder, London
 My Alpine Album (1940) A&C Black
 Adventures of a Mountaineer (1940) Dent
 The Mountain Vision (1941) Hodder, London
 Over Welsh Hills (1941) A&C Black
 Alpine Ways (1942) A&C Black
 Secret Mission (1942) Hodder and Stoughton, London
 British Mountaineers (1942) Collins
 Snow on the hills (1946) A&C Black
 The Mountain Top (1947) St Hugh's Press
 Again Switzerland (1947) Hodder, London
 Rocky Mountains (1948) A&C Black
 Swiss Winter (1948) A&C Black
 Mountains in Colour (1949) Max Parrish
 Climbs in the Canadian Rockies (1950) Hodder, London
Many were subsequently republished in the USA, some of the best have been gathered into collections.

Citations

References
Arnold Lunn, 'Smythe, Francis Sydney (1900–1949)', rev. A. M. Snodgrass, Oxford Dictionary of National Biography, Oxford University Press, 2004
 Royal Geographical Society—Imaging Everest 
 Simon Smythe – Grandson's recollection

1900 births
1949 deaths
English explorers
English male non-fiction writers
English mountain climbers
English nature writers
People educated at Berkhamsted School
People from Chamoli district
20th-century English male writers